On the Sunny Side is an album by American jazz tenor saxophonist Paul Quinichette featuring tracks recorded in May 1957 and released on the Prestige label.

Reception

Allmusic awarded the album 4 stars with its review by Scott Yanow calling it, "An enjoyable and underrated release".

Track listing
All compositions by Mal Waldron except as indicated
 "Blue Dots" - 7:54  
 "Circles" - 11:50  
 "On the Sunny Side of the Street" (Jimmy McHugh, Dorothy Fields) - 5:44  
 "Cool-Lypso" - 19:08  
 "My Funny Valentine" (Richard Rodgers, Lorenz Hart) - 7:24 Bonus track on CD reissue

Personnel 
Paul Quinichette - tenor saxophone
Curtis Fuller - trombone (tracks 1–4)
Sonny Red (tracks 1–4), John Jenkins (tracks 1 & 3–5) - alto saxophone
Mal Waldron - piano
Doug Watkins - bass
Ed Thigpen - drums

References 

1957 albums
Albums produced by Bob Weinstock
Paul Quinichette albums
Prestige Records albums
Albums recorded at Van Gelder Studio